2015 China Open may means one of these things below:
2015 China Open (snooker), a tournament that took place between April and March.
2015 China Open (tennis), a tournament that took place in October.